Epideira quoyi is a species of sea snail, a marine gastropod mollusk in the family Horaiclavidae.

Description
The length of the shell attains 25 mm.

Distribution
This marine species is endemic to Australia and occurs off South Australia, Tasmania and Victoria.

References

Further reading
 Desmoulins, C. 1842. Révision de quelques espèces de Pleurotomes. Actes de la Société Linnéene de Bordeaux 12: 109–185 
 Tryon, G.W. 1884. Conidae & Pleurotomidae. Manual of Conchology. Philadelphia : G.W. Tryon Vol. 6. 
 Pritchard, G.B. & Gatliff, J.H. 1900. Catalogue of the marine shells of Victoria. Part III. Proceedings of the Royal Society of Victoria 12(2): 170–205
 Verco, J.C. 1909. Notes on South Australian marine Mollusca with descriptions of new species. Part XII. Transactions of the Royal Society of South Australia 33: 293–342 
 Hedley, C. 1922. A revision of the Australian Turridae. Records of the Australian Museum 13(6): 213–359, pls 42–56 
  Tucker, J.K. 2004 Catalog of recent and fossil turrids (Mollusca: Gastropoda). Zootaxa 682:1–1295

External links
 Kiener, L.C. 1839–1840. Genre Pleurotome (Pleurotoma Lam.). 1–84, pls 1–27 in Spécies général et Iconographie des coquilles vivantes, comprenant la collection du Muséum d'histoire Naturelle de Paris, la collection de Lamarck, celle du Prince Massena (appartenant maintenant a M. le Baron B. Delessert) et les découvertes récentes des voyageurs. Paris : Rousseau Vol. 5.
 
  Tucker, J.K. 2004 Catalog of recent and fossil turrids (Mollusca: Gastropoda). Zootaxa 682:1–1295

quoyi
Gastropods of Australia
Gastropods described in 1842